The 2019 Albanian Supercup was the 26th edition of the Albanian Supercup, an annual Albanian football match. The teams were decided by taking the winner of the previous season's Albanian Superliga and the runner-up of the Albanian Cup.

The match was contested by Partizani, champions of the 2018–19 Albanian Superliga, and Kukësi, the 2018–19 Albanian Cup winner.

Details

See also

2018–19 Albanian Superliga
2018–19 Albanian Cup

References

2019
Supercup
Albanian Supercup, 2019
Albanian Supercup, 2019